Florea Văetuș (born 23 November 1956) is a Romanian former footballer who played as a striker.

Club career
Florea Văetuș was born on 23 November 1956 in Hunedoara, Romania and started playing football at junior level at local clubs Constructorul and Corvinul. He started to play football at senior level in 1975 at Divizia B club Victoria Călan, after one year moving to play for Mureșul Deva. He was suppose to make his Divizia A debut playing for Corvinul Hunedoara in a match against  
Sportul Studențesc București which was postponed because of the 1977 Vrancea earthquake, so on 20 March, coach Ladislau Vlad gave him his debut in a 2–2 against Jiul Petroșani. He spent five seasons at Corvinul, staying with the club when it relegated to Divizia B, helping it promote back to the first division after one year under coach Mircea Lucescu and in the middle of the 1981–82 season he was transferred to Dinamo București. In his first season spent at Dinamo, the club won The Double under coach Valentin Stănescu, Văetuș playing 13 matches and scoring 5 goals. In the following season, he was coached by Nicolae Dumitru, winning another title, scoring 7 goals in 31 Divizia A matches, also appearing in 5 matches in the 1982–83 European Cup. In the summer of 1983 Văetuș and teammates Nicușor Vlad, Teofil Stredie and other two players were transferred from Dinamo to Corvinul in exchange for Mircea Rednic and Ioan Andone. He played five seasons for Corvinul in his second spell, making his last Divizia A appearance on 22 June 1988 in a 2–1 loss against Rapid București, having a total of 308 games with 71 goals scored in the competition. After he ended his playing career in 1991 at Divizia B team, Metalurgistul Cugir, Văetuș worked as a manager at teams from the lower leagues of Romania.

International career
Florea Văetuș played under coach Mircea Lucescu seven matches for Romania's national team, scoring one goal in his debut, at a 3–1 victory against Cyprus at the successful Euro 1984 qualifiers, without being part of the squad that went at the final tournament. His following games were friendlies, his last appearance taking place on 11 April 1984 in a 0–0 against Israel, when he came as a substitute in order to replace Nicolae Ungureanu in the 79th minute of the game.

International goals
Scores and results list Romania's goal tally first, score column indicates score after each Văetuș goal.

Honours
Corvinul Hunedoara
Divizia B: 1979–80
Dinamo București
Divizia A: 1981–82, 1982–83
Cupa României: 1981–82

References

External links

1956 births
Living people
Romanian footballers
Romania international footballers
Association football forwards
Liga I players
Liga II players
CSM Deva players
CS Corvinul Hunedoara players
FC Dinamo București players
Romanian football managers
CS Corvinul Hunedoara managers
Sportspeople from Hunedoara